Averino is a rural locality (a selo) in Sysertsky District, Sverdlovsk Oblast, Russia. The population was 448 as of 2010. There are 12 streets.

Geography 
Averino is located 28 km southeast of Sysert (the district's administrative centre) by road. Kolyasnikovo is the nearest rural locality.

Ethnicity 
The village is inhabited by Russians.

References 

Rural localities in Sverdlovsk Oblast